Thoogudeepa is a 1966 Indian Kannada-language film, directed by K. S. L. Swamy in his directorial debut, and produced by R. G. Keshava Murthy. The film stars Rajkumar, Leelavathi, Narasimharaju and Udaykumar. The film has musical score by Vijaya Bhaskar. The movie is based on the Bengali novel Chandranath by Sarat Chandra Chatterjee.

P. B. Sreenivas made his first on-screen appearance through a song in this movie. The song Mounave Aabharana became the first song to be shot in Brindavan Gardens.

Cast
Rajkumar
Leelavathi
Narasimharaju
Udaykumar
B. V. Radha
T. N. Balakrishna
Thoogudeepa Srinivas
P. B. Sreenivas

Soundtrack
The music was composed by Vijaya Bhaskar.

References

External links
 

1966 films
1960s Kannada-language films
Films scored by Vijaya Bhaskar
1966 directorial debut films
Films directed by K. S. L. Swamy